Richard Moore was a 15th-century Archdeacon of Armagh: he was appointed by Papal provision in 1402 and was pardoned by the Crown on 28 July 28 that year.

Notes

Archdeacons of Armagh
15th-century Irish Roman Catholic priests